Hush! is Ana Popović's debut solo studio album, released on January 22, 2001 on Ruf Records. While studying at Utrecht Conservatory of Music in the Netherlands, she formed the Ana Popović Band to pay tuition costs. The band became popular in the Dutch and German music scenes, which brought her a record deal with Ruf Records, and brought her to Memphis in 2000 to record Hush!, named after her first band in Serbia, Hush. One track on the album, "Bring Your Fine Self Home", features a duet with Bernard Allison, son of blues great Luther Allison.

Track list

Personnel

Musicians
 Ana Popović – vocals, guitar, rhythm guitar, slide guitar
 Jack Holder – guitar, rhythm guitar
 William Lee Ellis – acoustic guitar
 Dave Smith – bass
 Bernard Allison – vocals (track 11)
 Jacqueline Johnson – background vocals
 Steve Mergen – drums
 Steve Potts – drums
 Sam Shoup – upright bass
 Jim Spake – saxophone
 Scott Thompson – trumpet
 Ernest Williamson – organ, piano

Production
 Jim Gaines – production and mixing in Memphis
 Brad Blackwood – mastering
 John Hampton – mixing
 Dawn Hopkins – engineering

References

2001 debut albums
Ana Popović albums